Reinaldo Almeida Lopes da Silva, known as Reinaldo (born 16 January 1965) is a former Portuguese football player.

He played 11 seasons and 231 games (scoring 42 goals) in the Primeira Liga for União de Leiria, Académica de Coimbra, Penafiel and Alcobaça.

Club career
He made his Primeira Liga debut for Alcobaça on 22 August 1982 as a late substitute in a 1–1 draw against Rio Ave.

References

1965 births
People from Caldas da Rainha
Living people
Portuguese footballers
Primeira Liga players
Liga Portugal 2 players
G.C. Alcobaça players
Associação Académica de Coimbra – O.A.F. players
F.C. Penafiel players
U.D. Leiria players
S.C. Campomaiorense players
Association football forwards
Sportspeople from Leiria District